Pro X or Pro-X may refer to:

Television 
 Pro Arena, a Romanian TV channel formerly named Pro X
 Pro X, a Kohavision TV show

Biology 
 Cytosol nonspecific dipeptidase, an enzyme also known as Pro-X dipeptidase
 Lysosomal Pro-X carboxypeptidase, an enzyme
 Membrane Pro-X carboxypeptidase, an enzyme
 Prolyl aminopeptidase, an enzyme also known as Pro-X aminopeptidase

Software 
 Modbook Pro X, a type of tablet computer
 Final Cut Pro X, a non-linear video editing application
 Logic Pro X, a digital audio workstation
 Samplitude Pro X, a version of the Magix Samplitude digital audio workstation 
 Video Pro X, a video editor by Magix
 Snapz Pro X, a utility computer application
 Xara Designer Pro X, a version of the Xara Photo & Graphic Designer image editing program

Technology 
 Korg Triton Pro X, a version of the Korg Triton music workstation synthesizer
 Razor Pro X, a RazorUSA kick scooter model
 Telstra Wi-Fi 4G Advanced Pro X, a mobile broadband device